Robert "Bobby" Angus Wilson (born 23 July 1943) is a footballer who played as a right-back in the Scottish Football League for Cowdenbeath and Dundee. Wilson was given a testimonial match by Dundee, played against Celtic on 1 December 1975. Wilson went on to manage Raith Rovers and Ross County. He was inducted into the Dundee FC Hall of Fame in 2013.

References

External links

1943 births
Living people
Scottish footballers
Cowdenbeath F.C. players
Dundee F.C. players
Scottish Football League players
Dundonald Bluebell F.C. players
Lossiemouth F.C. players
Scottish Football League representative players
Association football fullbacks
Footballers from Fife
Scottish Junior Football Association players